Tomato and egg soup ( or ) is a dish from China consisting mainly of tomato and egg. It is a relatively easy soup to make, and as such is one of the most popular soups in households.

This soup is also high in nutritional value, consisting of ingredients such as lycopene from the tomatoes, which can reduce the possibility of cancer.

Normally, the soup is made from coarsely chopped tomatoes, and green onions chopped to pieces of about of 0.5 cm. Half a litre of water is used in this soup, and a small amount of oil. Eggs are added toward the end of this dish, and stirred in for only about 3 minutes. It is normally covered for 2 minutes, and then served when the egg has set.

This soup is also sometimes made with the tomato skin removed, and is sometimes cooked for a longer time.

Main ingredients
Tomato
Egg
Green onion
Oil
Salt
MSG
Boiling water

See also

 List of Chinese soups
 List of soups
 List of tomato dishes

References

External links
Image
Image

Chinese soups
Egg dishes
Tomato dishes
Food combinations